Dominici was a progressive metal band formed in 2005 by former Dream Theater vocalist Charlie Dominici.

History
The band's only released work to date is the O3 Trilogy, a series of three concept albums about the story of a terrorist sleeper cell coming to the United States and falling in love with the country. Dominici was an opening-act for three Dream Theater "Chaos in Motion Tour" concerts that were held in Croatia, Hungary, and Austria.

In 2011 Charlie Dominici stated on his Facebook account that Dominici the band was returning to strength, but he also mentioned in the comments of the post that if people wanted to see them live or releasing another CD, then fans should spread the word about them, saying "hardly anyone knows about us". Dominici has been inactive since this time.

Members
 Charlie Dominici – vocals, acoustic guitar, harmonica (2005–2011)
 Riccardo Atzeni – bass (2007–2011)
 Brian Maillard – guitars (2007–2011)
 Yan Maillard – drums, percussion (2007–2011)
 Americo Rigoldi – keyboards (2007–2011)
 Lucio Manca – bass (2011)

Discography
 2005: O3 A Trilogy: Part One
 2007: O3 A Trilogy – Part 2
 2008: O3 A Trilogy – Part 3

References

External links
Official website (archived)

Musical groups established in 2005
Heavy metal musical groups from New York (state)
American progressive metal musical groups
Dream Theater
Inside Out Music artists